Air Vice Marshal Malcolm Henderson,  (1 June 1891 – 7 March 1978) was a Royal Flying Corps pilot during the First World War and a senior commander in the Royal Air Force during the Second World War.  

Henderson began the First World War as an army private, in the London Scottish battalion, but was commissioned into the Seaforth Highlanders in 1915 and seconded to the Royal Flying Corps. In 1916 he was awarded the Distinguished Service Order. The citation read: 

Later that year the French government awarded him the Croix de guerre.

In the 1920s he spent some years in Egypt, commanding first 216 Squadron (with Airco DH.10 Amiens aircraft) and then No. 47 Squadron (with DH.9As).

He was Air Officer Commanding No. 14 (Fighter) Group during the Battle of Britain.

References

External links
Air of Authority – A History of RAF Organisation – Air Vice-Marshal M Henderson

|-

|-

1891 births
1978 deaths
London Scottish soldiers
British Army personnel of World War I
Seaforth Highlanders officers
Royal Flying Corps officers
Royal Air Force personnel of World War II
Companions of the Distinguished Service Order
Companions of the Order of the Bath
Companions of the Order of the Indian Empire
Commanders of the Order of the British Empire
Recipients of the Croix de Guerre 1914–1918 (France)
Royal Air Force air marshals